Bo Diddley's a Twister is the seventh studio album by American musician Bo Diddley released on the Checker label in 1962 .

Reception

AllMusic reviewer Bruce Eder stated "A lot of the material on this record was rushed out in half-finished form, in order to get an album out that cashed in on the "twist" craze of early 1962. ... In all, it isn't half-bad for an album that nobody intended as such, though most of the best has been included on various hits compilations".

Track listing 
All tracks credited to Ellas McDaniel 
 "Detour" – 2:00
 "She's Alright" – 4:07
 "Doin' the Jaguar" – 2:10
 "Who Do You Love?" – 2:30
 "Shank" – 1:58
 "Road Runner" – 2:49
 "My Babe" – 1:49
 "The Twister" – 2:09
 "Hey! Bo Diddley" – 2:13
 "Hush Your Mouth" – 2:52
 "Bo Diddley" – 2:31
 "I'm Looking for a Woman" – 2:34
 "Here 'Tis" – 2:28
 "I Know" – 2:48

Personnel 
Bo Diddley – vocals, guitar
Peggy Jones, Norma-Jean Wofford – guitar, background vocals
Jesse James Johnson – bass
Frank Kirkland – drums
Jerome Green – maracas, backing vocals
The Vibrations, Carrie Mingo, Grace Ruffin, Margie Clark, Sandra Bears – background vocals

References 

1962 albums
Bo Diddley albums
Checker Records albums
Albums produced by Phil Chess